Abū ʿAbd Allāh Muḥammad ibn Ziyād, surnamed Ibn al-Aʿrābī (ca. 760 – 846, Sāmarrā); a philologist, genealogist, and oral traditionist of Arabic tribal poetry. A grammarian of the school of al-Kūfah, who rivalled the grammarians of al-Baṣrah in poetry recital. He was famous for his knowledge of rare expressions and for transmitting the famous anthology of ancient Arabic poetry, Al-Mufaḍḍalīyāt.

The meaning of the word A'rābī, and its difference to the word Arabī, is explained by the exegete al-Sijistānī, in his book on rare Qur’ānic terms: A'rābī is a non-Arab desert inhabitant, whereas Arabī is a non-desert dwelling Arab.

Life
Ibn al-Aʿrābī was born in al-Kūfah in 760.  His father, Ziyād, had been captured from Sindh, probably by the Banū Hāshim, or possibly by the Banū Shaybān or some other tribe. He himself was a mawla (client) of al-Abbās ibn Muḥammad ibn Alī ibn ʿAbd Allāh. He was said to have a cast.  His mother had been a servant of, and later married, al-Mufaḍḍal ibn Muḥammad al-Ḍabbī, the author of Al-Mufaḍḍalīyāt, and as his stepson, Ibn al-Aʿrābī received a broad education in the Ḥadīth, poetry, history, theology, genealogy and literature. The centres  of scholarship in these fields encompassed by the term ʿphilology’ were at al-Baṣrah, al-Kūfah, and later at Baghdād. Apart from al-Mufaḍḍal, Ibn al-A'rābī's principal tutor was the qāḍī (judge) al-Qāsim ibn Ma’n ibn ʿAbd al-Raḥmān.  Abū Mu’āwiyah al-Ḍarīr, and al-Kisā’ī, also tutored him.

Ibn al- Aʿrābī became a scholar of the Arab tribes and of the poets of the Jahiliya (pre-Islamic) and Islamic era, up to the beginning of the rule of the Banū al-ʿAbbās. Other scholars were Abū ʿAmr al-Shaybānī, Khālid ibn Kulthūm , Muḥammad ibn Ḥabīb, al-Ṭūsī, and al-Aṣma’ī.

His lectures were very popular and Abū al-Abbās Tha’lab, who was his student of ten years, reports that a hundred people typically attended his lectures, coming from as far afield as Isfījāb in Transoxiana, and from Spain.   A glimpse into the setting for scholarly debate occurring at this time is indicated in an anecdote told by Thaʿlab, where a group of scholars, that included al-Sukkarī, Abū al-ʿĀliyah and Ibn al-A'rābī, had assembled at the home of Aḥmad ibn Sa’īd.  It appears that Aḥmad ibn Saʿīd and Ibn al-Aʿrabi were astonished, presumably impressed, by Thaʿlab’s precocious critique of a poem by al-Shammākh.

Ibn al-Aʿrābī quoted such Arabian linguistic authorities as al-Ṣamūtī, al-Kalbī, and Abū Mujīb.  His pupils included Ibrāhīm al-Ḥarbī, Ibn al-Sikkīt, and Ibn al-Azhar.  As a leading philologist, Ibn al- Aʿrābī was critical of rival scholars of rare linguistic expressions (al-kalām al-gharīb), and in particular of Abū Ubaydah  and al-Aṣma’ī.  He proposed orthographic liberalisation and urged permissiveness in the substitution of the letter dād (ض) for the letter zā (ظ).   Muḥammad ibn Ḥabīb, quoted Ibn al-A’rābī, along with Quṭrub, Abū ʿUbaydah, Abū al-Yaqẓān, et al.

Tha’lab and al-Ṭabarī wrote Ibn al-A'rābī's biography, while anecdotes about him and his philological commentaries were popular. Thaʿlab reports never seeing a book in his hand, even when he was over eighty years old.  This was a huge tribute as scholars attached great importance to facility of memorisation.  Tha'lab also claims no one surpassed Ibn al-A'rābī in his knowledge of poetry. Al-Nadīm read Ibn al-Kūfī ʿs account that Thaʿlab had heard him say he was born the night Abū Ḥanīfah died. Al-Qāsim had met, and was an admirer of, Abū Ḥanīfah. 

Ibn al-Aʿrābī died in 846 (231 AH), in Surra Man Ra’ā,  (i.e. the ancient name of Sāmarrā), Iraq, aged eighty years, four months and three days.

Works
Among his books there were:
 Kitāb Al-Nawadir; (ʿAnecdotes’), a large book;  Rare Forms, which was quoted by a group of scholars among whom were al-Ṭūsī, Thaʿlab, and others —some say there were twelve and some say nine quotations (transcriptions);
 Al-Anwā’ Al-Anwā’;
 Ṣifat al-Khayl; ʿDescription of the Horse’;
 Ṣifat al-Zara’ ʿDescription of the Palm (or Corn in the Blade)’;
 Al-Khayl ʿHorses’;
 Madh al-Qabā’il ʿTribute of the (History [epochs] of the) Tribes’;
 Ma’anī al-Sha’ir ʿMeaning of Poetry’;
 Tafsīr al-Amthāl ʿExplanation of Similes’, or ʿExposition of Proverbs’
 Al-Nabāt 'Plants';
 Al-Alfāz ʿPronunciations (Dialects)’ or ʿVocabulary’;
 Nisba al-Khail ʿPedigrees of Horses’;
 Nawadir al-Zabīrīyīn Rare Forms of the Inhabitants of Dabīr; 
 Nawādir banī Fakās  ʿAnecdotes of the Banū Faqʿas;
 Al-Dabāb – bi khaṭ al-Sukkarī; ʿFlies' – copied in the handwriting of al-Sukkarī. 
 Al-Nabāt wa-al-Baqal ʿPlants and Herbs’;
 Gharīb al-Ḥadīth The Strange in the Ḥadīth

Legacy
Al-A'rābī's importance as a philologist, or linguistic scientist, of the Arab language, and his milieu, can be estimated by the account given by the tenth-century bibliophile Al-Nadim, who writing about a hundred and fifty years after the death of Ibn al-A'rābī, describes visiting the library in the city of al-Ḥadīthah of Muḥammad ibn al-Ḥusayn, known as ʿIbn Abī Baʿrah’, who had received a collection of ancient writings from a Shī’ī book-collector of al-Kūfah.  Among the material on the sciences of Arabs and other nations, there were documents written on double parchment, deeds, taʿlīqāt, poems, papers on grammar, anecdotes,  historical traditions, names, genealogies, etc., on adam skins and on paper from Egypt, China, Tihāmah, and Khurāsān; notes written in an ancient calligraphy by ʿAllān the Grammarian and al-Naḍr ibn Shumayl; and Ḥadīth authorities, such as Sufyān ibn ʿUyaynah, Sufyān al-Thawri, al-Awzāʿī.Of the scholars, whose handwritten notes on Arabic grammar and philological literature, and other ancient works, he lists are Abū ʿAmr ibn al-ʿAlā', Abū ʿAmr al-Shaybanī, al-Aṣma’ī, Ibn al-Aʿrābī, Sībawayh, al-Farrā’, al-Kisā’ī, Abū al-Aswad (in the handwriting of Yaḥyā ibn Yaʿmar).

Ibn al-Aʿrābī transmitted the authorised edition of the Al-Mufaḍḍalīyāt, one hundred and twenty-eight poems, that begins with a poem of Ta’abbaṭa Sharran Thābit ibn Jābir, where others selected, extended, and reordered the poems.

See also
List of Arab scientists and scholars
Encyclopædia Britannica Online

Notes

References

Bibliography

760s births
846 deaths
8th-century people from the Abbasid Caliphate
8th-century philologists
8th-century scholars
8th-century scientists
8th-century writers
8th-century zoologists
9th-century people from the Abbasid Caliphate
9th-century philologists
9th-century scholars
9th-century scientists
9th-century writers
9th-century zoologists
Arabists
Iraqi entomologists
Grammarians of Kufa
Iraqi scholars
Iraqi scientists
Scientists from the Abbasid Caliphate
Medieval grammarians of Arabic
Medieval linguists
Zoologists of the medieval Islamic world
8th-century Arabic poets
9th-century Arabic poets